Ghazaviyeh-ye Kuchek (also Romanized as Ghazāvīyeh-ye Kūchek, Ghazāvīyeh-ye Kuchak; also known as Ghazāvīyeh-ye Do, Ghazzawiyeh, Qal‘eh-ye Ghazāvīyeh, and Qazāvīyeh Kūchak) is a village in Kut-e Abdollah Rural District, in the Central District of Karun County, Khuzestan Province, Iran. At the 2006 census, its population was 789, in 148 families.

References 

Populated places in Karun County